Anglesboro or Anglesborough (historically anglicized as Gleanagruer) is a small village at the foot of the Galtee Mountains, in southeastern County Limerick, Ireland. The nearest town is Mitchelstown in County Cork approximately 12 kilometres away.

Liam Lynch (1893-1923) was an Irish republican military leader. He served as Chief of Staff of the Irish Republican Army between March 1922-April 1923. He born at Barnagurraha and attended Anglesboro National School. A leading military commander in the War of Independence, he opposed the Anglo-Irish Treaty on the grounds that it dis-established the Irish Republic proclaimed in 1916 and he assumed the position of Chief-of-Staff of the anti-treaty IRA called the "Irregulars". He was killed in a skirmish with Free State forces on the Knockmealdown Mountains in County Tipperary on 10 April 1923, aged 29.

References

External links
 Anglesboro Community Council

Towns and villages in County Limerick